Washington Township is one of fourteen townships in Miami County, Indiana, United States. As of the 2010 census, its population was 3,493 and it contained 1,630 housing units.

History
The first settler, Thomas Henton, arrived in Washington Township in 1838 and built a cabin upon a hill.

Washington Township  was organized in 1843. It was named for President George Washington.

Geography
The Wabash River defines the township's northern border.

Cities, towns, villages
 Peru (southeast quarter)

Unincorporated towns
 Park View Heights at 
 South Peru at 
(This list is based on USGS data and may include former settlements.)

Cemeteries
The township contains these four cemeteries: Crider, Rankin, Salem and Sharpee.

Major highways
  U.S. Route 24
  Indiana State Road 19

Airports and landing strips
 Shinn Bone Lane Airport

School districts
 Maconaquah School Corporation
 Peru Community Schools

Political districts
 Indiana's 5th congressional district
 State House District 23
 State House District 32
 State Senate District 18

References
 
 United States Census Bureau 2008 TIGER/Line Shapefiles
 IndianaMap

External links
 Indiana Township Association
 United Township Association of Indiana
 City-Data.com page for Washington Township

Townships in Miami County, Indiana
Townships in Indiana